Maximus Ritter von Imhof (26 July 1758 – 11 April 1817), born at Reisbach, in Bavaria, was a German physicist. He taught in the monastery in Munich from 1786 to 1791.

Catholic Encyclopedia article

See also
List of Roman Catholic scientist-clerics

1758 births
1817 deaths
18th-century German physicists
Catholic clergy scientists
Scientists from Bavaria